The Vârciorog Waterfall  is a tourist attraction and a protected area, located in the Apuseni Natural Park, Romania. It is situated on a small right tributary of the river Arieșul Mare, near the village Vanvucești. The waterfall is 15 m high.

References

 Parcul Natural Apuseni 

Protected areas of Romania
Geography of Alba County